Something in Your Eyes may refer to:

 "Something in Your Eyes" (Richard Carpenter song), 1987
 "Something in Your Eyes" (Bell Biv DeVoe song), 1993
 "Something in Your Eyes" (Jenny Silver song), 2011, covered by Steps in 2020
 "Something in Your Eyes", a song by Right Said Fred from Stand Up, 2002
 "Something in Your Eyes", a 1999 song by Ed Case
 "Something in Your Eyes", a 2008 song by Price
 "Something in Your Eyes", a 2010 song by Shonlock